E262 may refer to:
 Sodium acetate – sodium salt of acetic acid;
 European route E262 – road from European road system.